José Barnabé de Mesquita (March 10, 1892, Cuiabá – June 22, 1961, Cuiabá), generally known as José de Mesquita, was a Brazilian poet parnassian, romance and short story writer, historiographer, journalist, essayist, genealogist and jurist.

Biography
José de Mesquita graduated from the Faculty of Law of São Paulo University in 1913. He was later appointed as a judge at the Justice Court by the Mato Grosso State, and was its President for 11 consecutive years (1929–1940).

He was one of the founders of the Historic Institute in 1919, and the Academy of Letters by the Mato Grosso in 1921, of which he was a founding member and president since its foundation up to his death in 1961. De Mesquita's book Mirror of Souls, (stories) was awarded by the Brazilian Academy of Letters in Rio de Janeiro in 1932. He was a correspondent for the Brazilian Historic and Geographic Institute and the Federation of the Academy of Letters of Brazil (both based in Rio de Janeiro), since 1939.

See also

José de Mesquita (in Brazilian Portuguese Wikipedia)
Virtual Library José de Mesquita, Bibliography (in Brazilian Portuguese)

1892 births
1961 deaths
People from Cuiabá
20th-century Brazilian poets
Brazilian male poets
Brazilian jurists
Brazilian journalists
Brazilian male short story writers
Brazilian genealogists
Brazilian essayists
Brazilian people of Portuguese descent
University of São Paulo alumni
20th-century Brazilian short story writers
20th-century essayists
20th-century Brazilian male writers
20th-century journalists